Parthenina gabmulderi is a species of sea snail, a marine gastropod mollusk in the family Pyramidellidae, the pyrams and their allies.

Distribution
This marine species occurs off the following locations:
 Cape Verde

References

External links
 To Encyclopedia of Life

Pyramidellidae
Gastropods of Cape Verde
Gastropods described in 2000